Elbee Airlines was India's first all-cargo airline based in Mumbai, India. Elbee Airlines was started as a wholly owned subsidiary of Elbee Services, one of India's largest express logistics company that itself closed down in 2002. It operated domestic cargo services until July 1998. It became operational in June 1995 having acquired an air-taxi-operator's certificate from the Directorate General of Civil Aviation to operate four Fokkers on domestic routes. The Airline planned a 57 million dollar fleet renewal in 1996, by bringing in three Boeing 727 and three McDonnell Douglas DC-10 freighters to add to its three Fokker F27s. However, after its freighter Fokker 27 crashed in 1997, business never returned to normalcy and the airline ceased operations by July 1998.

Destinations 
Elbee operated freight services to the following destinations: 

Delhi - Indira Gandhi International Airport
Bengaluru - Bengaluru International Airport
Mumbai - Chhatrapati Shivaji International Airport base
Chennai - Chennai International Airport

Fleet 
The fleet consisted of three Fokker 27 turboprop aircraft (in cargo configuration).

Accidents and incidents
VT-SSA, operating cargo flight on the Mumbai-Bangalore sector, crashed into the Arabian Sea off the Coast of Mumbai on 3 July 1997. The aircraft was destroyed on impact and both crew members died. Severe weather conditions encountered soon after take-off were said to be responsible for the accident.

References 

Airlines established in 1994
Airlines disestablished in 1998
Defunct airlines of India
Indian companies established in 1994
Indian companies disestablished in 1998
Companies based in Mumbai
1994 establishments in Maharashtra